Realiti may refer to:

Realiti (TV series), a Malaysian series
"Realiti" (song), by Grimes

See also
 Reality (disambiguation)